The British Society for Oral and Dental Research was established in 1953. It exists to:
 Support and represent the oral health research community in the UK.
 Encourage junior workers to become involved in oral and dental research.
 Facilitate the dissemination and application of research findings relating to oral health and the interactions between oral and systemic health.

References 

Dental organisations based in the United Kingdom
1953 establishments in the United Kingdom